Patrick Felix Vervoort (born 17 January 1965 in Beerse) is a retired Belgian footballer.

The left midfielder has played for a number of clubs, including Beerschot, Anderlecht and Standard Liège in Belgium, Ascoli in Italy's Serie A, as well Girondins de Bordeaux in France.

He was also a member of the Belgium team in the 1986 and 1990 World Cups.

Honours

Player 
RSC Anderlecht

 Belgian Cup: 1987–88, 1988–89
 Belgian Supercup: 1985, 1987
 European Cup Winners' Cup: 1989–90 (runners-up)

Standard Liège

 Belgian Cup: 1992–93

International 
Belgium

 FIFA World Cup: 1986 (fourth place)

References

External links

1965 births
Living people
Belgian footballers
Belgium international footballers
Association football midfielders
K. Beerschot V.A.C. players
R.S.C. Anderlecht players
FC Girondins de Bordeaux players
Ascoli Calcio 1898 F.C. players
Standard Liège players
RKC Waalwijk players
SC Toulon players
Vitória S.C. players
Belgian Pro League players
Eredivisie players
Ligue 1 players
Primeira Liga players
Serie A players
Expatriate footballers in Italy
Expatriate footballers in Portugal
Expatriate footballers in France
Belgian expatriate footballers
Belgian expatriate sportspeople in Italy
Belgian expatriate sportspeople in Portugal
Belgian expatriate sportspeople in France
1986 FIFA World Cup players
1990 FIFA World Cup players
People from Beerse
Footballers from Antwerp Province